Ernst Günther was a Swiss long-distance runner. He competed in the men's 5000 metres at the 1948 Summer Olympics.

References

External links
 

Year of birth missing
Possibly living people
Athletes (track and field) at the 1948 Summer Olympics
Swiss male long-distance runners
Olympic athletes of Switzerland
Place of birth missing